Khosheutovo is a rural locality (a selo) and the administrative center of Khosheutovsky Selsoviet, Kharabalinsky District, Astrakhan Oblast, Russia. The population was 2,097 as of 2010. There are 29 streets.

Geography 
Khosheutovo is located 71 km southeast of Kharabali (the district's administrative centre) by road. Akhtubinka is the nearest rural locality.

References 

Rural localities in Kharabalinsky District